The 2022 Transylvania Open was a women's tennis tournament played on indoor hard courts. It was the second edition of the Transylvania Open, and part of the WTA 250 series of the 2022 WTA Tour. It was held at the BT Arena in Cluj-Napoca, Romania, from 10 until 16 October 2022.

The event is one of the six tournaments that were given single-year WTA 250 licenses in September and October 2022 due to the cancellation of tournaments in China during the 2022 season because of the ongoing COVID-19 pandemic, as well as the suspension of tournaments in China following former WTA player Peng Shuai's allegation of sexual assault against a Chinese government official.

Champions

Singles

  Anna Blinkova def.  Jasmine Paolini 6–2, 3–6, 6–2

This is Blinkova's first career singles title.

Doubles

  Kirsten Flipkens /  Laura Siegemund def.  Kamilla Rakhimova /  Yana Sizikova 6–3, 7–5

Singles main draw entrants

Seeds

 Rankings are as of October 3, 2022.

Other entrants
The following players received wildcards into the main draw:
  Irina Bara
  Eugenie Bouchard
  Elena-Gabriela Ruse

The following players received entry using a protected ranking: 
  Laura Siegemund

The following players received entry from the qualifying draw:
  Elina Avanesyan
  Anna Blinkova
  Ysaline Bonaventure
  Olga Danilović
  Kamilla Rakhimova
  Anastasia Zakharova

The following players received entry as lucky losers:
  Océane Dodin
  Tamara Korpatsch
  Harmony Tan

Withdrawals
Before the tournament
  Irina-Camelia Begu → replaced by  Harriet Dart
  Kaja Juvan → replaced by  Dayana Yastremska
  Barbora Krejčíková → replaced by  Océane Dodin
  Aleksandra Krunić → replaced by  Dalma Gálfi
  Tereza Martincová → replaced by  Tamara Korpatsch
  Mayar Sherif → replaced by  Wang Xinyu
  Laura Siegemund → replaced by  Harmony Tan
  Sara Sorribes Tormo → replaced by  Varvara Gracheva

Doubles main draw entrants

Seeds

 Rankings are as of October 3, 2022.

Other entrants
The following pairs received wildcards into the doubles main draw:
  Tímea Babos /  Ingrid Neel 
  Jaqueline Cristian /  Elena-Gabriela Ruse

Withdrawals 
Before the tournament
  Kirsten Flipkens /  Sara Sorribes Tormo → replaced by  Kirsten Flipkens /  Laura Siegemund
  Anna-Lena Friedsam /  Monica Niculescu → replaced by  Harriet Dart /  Monica Niculescu
  Marta Kostyuk /  Tereza Martincová → replaced by  Oksana Kalashnikova /  Marta Kostyuk
  Aleksandra Krunić /  Katarzyna Piter → replaced by  Viktorija Golubic /  Han Xinyun

References

External links
Official website
WTA official website

Transylvania Open
Tennis tournaments in Romania
Transylvania Open
Transylvania Open